Membrane fouling is a process whereby a solution or a particle is deposited on a membrane surface or in membrane pores in a processes such as in a membrane bioreactor, reverse osmosis, forward osmosis, membrane distillation, ultrafiltration, microfiltration, or nanofiltration so that the membrane's performance is degraded. It is a major obstacle to the widespread use of this technology. Membrane fouling can cause severe flux decline and affect the quality of the water produced. Severe fouling may require intense chemical cleaning or membrane replacement. This increases the operating costs of a treatment plant. There are various types of foulants: colloidal (clays, flocs), biological (bacteria, fungi), organic (oils, polyelectrolytes, humics) and scaling (mineral precipitates).

Fouling can be divided into reversible and irreversible fouling based on the attachment strength of particles to the membrane surface. Reversible fouling can be removed by a strong shear force or backwashing. Formation of a strong matrix of fouling layer with the solute during a continuous filtration process will result in reversible fouling being transformed into an irreversible fouling layer. Irreversible fouling is the strong attachment of particles which cannot be removed by physical cleaning.

Influential factors 

Factors that affect membrane fouling:

Recent fundamental studies indicate that membrane fouling is influenced by numerous factors such as system hydrodynamics, operating conditions, membrane properties, and material properties (solute). At low pressure, low feed concentration, and high feed velocity, concentration polarisation effects are minimal and flux is almost proportional to trans-membrane pressure difference. However, in the high pressure range, flux becomes almost independent of applied pressure. Deviation from linear flux-pressure relation is due to concentration polarization. At low feed flow rate or with high feed concentration, the limiting flux situation is observed even at relatively low pressures.

Measurement 

Flux, transmembrane pressure (TMP), Permeability, and Resistance are the best indicators of membrane fouling. Under constant flux operation, TMP increases to compensate for the fouling. On the other hand, under constant pressure operation, flux declines due to membrane fouling. In some technologies such as membrane distillation, fouling reduces membrane rejection, and thus permeate quality (e.g. as measured by electrical conductivity) is a primary measurement for fouling.

Fouling control 

Even though membrane fouling is an inevitable phenomenon during membrane filtration, it can be minimised by strategies such as cleaning, appropriate membrane selection and choice of operating conditions.

Membranes can be cleaned physically, biologically or chemically.  Physical cleaning includes gas scour, sponges, water jets or backflushing using permeate or pressurized air. Biological cleaning uses biocides to remove all viable microorganisms, whereas chemical cleaning involves the use of acids and bases to remove foulants and impurities.

Another strategy to minimise membrane fouling is the use of the appropriate membrane for a specific operation. The nature of the feed water must first be known; then a membrane that is less prone to fouling with that solution is chosen. For aqueous filtration, a hydrophilic membrane is preferred. For membrane distillation, a hydrophobic membrane is preferred.

Operating conditions during membrane filtration are also vital, as they may affect fouling conditions during filtration. For instance, crossflow filtration is often preferred to dead end filtration, because turbulence generated during the filtration entails a thinner deposit layer and therefore minimises fouling (e.g. tubular pinch effect).  In some applications such as in many MBR applications, air scour is used to promote turbulence at the membrane surface.

See also 
 Vibratory shear-enhanced process
 Water purification

References

Water technology
Fouling
Membrane technology